Maserati S.p.A. is an Italian luxury vehicle manufacturer. Established on 1 December 1914, in Bologna, Italy, the company's headquarters are now in Modena, and its emblem is a trident. The company has been owned by Stellantis since 2021. Maserati was initially associated with Ferrari. In May 2014, due to ambitious plans and product launches, Maserati sold a record of over 3,000 cars in one month. This caused them to increase production of the Quattroporte and Ghibli models. In addition to the Ghibli and Quattroporte, Maserati offers the Maserati GranTurismo and the Maserati Levante (the first ever Maserati SUV). Maserati has placed a yearly production output cap at 75,000 vehicles globally.

History

The Maserati brothers

The Maserati brothers, Alfieri (1887–1932), Bindo (1883–1980), Carlo (1881–1910), Ettore (1894–1990), and Ernesto (1898–1975), were all involved with automobiles from the beginning of the 20th century. Alfieri, Bindo, and Ernesto built 2-litre Grand Prix cars for Diatto. In 1926, Diatto suspended the production of race cars, leading to the creation of the first Maserati and the founding of the Maserati marque. One of the first Maseratis, driven by Alfieri, won the 1926 Targa Florio. Maserati began making race cars with 4, 6, 8, and 16 cylinders (two straight-eights mounted parallel to one another).

The trident logo of the Maserati car company, designed by Mario Maserati, is based on the Fountain of Neptune in Bologna's Piazza Maggiore. In 1920, one of the Maserati brothers used this symbol in the logo at the suggestion of family friend Marquis Diego de Sterlich. It was considered particularly appropriate for the sports car company due to the fact that Neptune represents strength and vigour; additionally the statue is a characteristic symbol of the company's original home city.

Alfieri Maserati died in 1932, but three other brothers, Bindo, Ernesto, and Ettore kept the firm going.

Orsi ownership
In 1937, the remaining Maserati brothers sold their shares in the company to the Adolfo Orsi family, who, in 1940, relocated the company headquarters to their home town of Modena, where it remains to this day. The brothers continued in engineering roles with the company. Racing successes continued, even against the giants of German racing, Auto Union and Mercedes. In back-to-back wins in 1939 and 1940, an 8CTF won the Indianapolis 500, making Maserati the only Italian manufacturer ever to do so.

The second world war then intervened and Maserati abandoned car making to produce components for the Italian war effort. During this time, Maserati worked in fierce competition to construct a V16 town car for Benito Mussolini before Ferry Porsche of Volkswagen built one for Adolf Hitler. This failed, and the plans were scrapped. Once peace was restored, Maserati returned to making cars; the A6 series did well in the post-war racing scene.

Key people joined the Maserati team. Alberto Massimino, a former FIAT engineer with both Alfa Romeo and Ferrari experience, oversaw the design of all racing models for the next ten years. With him joined engineers Giulio Alfieri, Vittorio Bellentani, and Gioacchino Colombo. The focus was on the best engines and chassis to succeed in car racing. These new projects saw the last contributions of the Maserati brothers, who, after their 10-year contract with Orsi expired, went on to form O.S.C.A. This new team at Maserati worked on several projects: the 4CLT, the A6 series, the 8CLT, and, pivotally for the future success of the company, the A6GCS.

The famous Argentinian grand prix driver Juan-Manuel Fangio raced for Maserati for a number of years in the 1950s, achieving a number of stunning victories including winning the world championship in 1957 in the 250F. Other racing projects in the 1950s were the 200S, 300S, 350S, and 450S, followed in 1961 by the famous Tipo 61.

Withdrawal from racing
Maserati retired from factory racing participation because of the Guidizzolo tragedy during the 1957 Mille Miglia, though they continued to build cars for privateers. Maserati became more and more focused on building road-going grand tourers.

The 1957 3500 GT marked a turning point in the marque's history, as its first ground-up grand tourer design and first series-produced car. Production jumped from a dozen to a few hundred cars a year.
Chief engineer Giulio Alfieri took charge of the project and turned the 3.5-litre inline six from the 350S into a road-going engine. Launched with a Carrozzeria Touring 2+2 coupé aluminium body over superleggera structure, a steel-bodied short wheelbase Vignale 3500 GT Spyder open top version followed in 1959. The 3500 GT's success, with over 2,200 made, was critical to Maserati's survival in the years following withdrawal from racing.

The 3500 GT also provided the underpinnings for the small-volume V8-engined 5000 GT, another seminal car for Maserati. Born from the Shah of Persia's whim of owning a road car powered by the Maserati 450S racing engine, it became one of the fastest and most expensive cars of its days. The third to the thirty-fourth and last example produced were powered by Maserati's first purely road-going V8 engine design.

In 1962, the 3500 GT evolved into the Sebring, bodied by Vignale and based on the shorter wheelbase convertible chassis. Next came the two-seater Mistral coupé in 1963 and Spider in 1964, both powered by a six-cylinder engine and styled by Pietro Frua.

In 1963, the company's first saloon was launched, the Quattroporte, also styled by Frua. If the 5000 GT inaugurated the marque's first road-going V8, the Quattroporte's Tipo 107 4.2-litre DOHC V8 was the forefather of all Maserati V8s up to 1990.

The Ghia-designed Ghibli coupé was launched in 1967. It was powered by a 4.7-litre dry sump version of Maserati's quad cam V8. The Ghibli Spyder and high performance 4.9-litre Ghibli SS followed.

Citroën ownership
In 1968, Maserati was taken over by Citroën. Adolfo Orsi remained the nominal president, but Maserati was controlled by its new owner. The relationship started as a joint venture, made public in January 1968, in which Maserati would design and manufacture an engine for Citroën's upcoming flagship called SM. Launched in 1970, the SM was a four-seat front-wheel-drive coupé, powered by a Maserati Tipo C114 2.7-litre 90° V6 engine; this engine and its gearbox had been used in other vehicles, such as rally-prepared DSs used by Bob Neyret in Bandama Rally, and in the Ligier JS2.

With secure financial backing, new models were launched and built in much greater numbers than years prior. Citroën borrowed Maserati's expertise and engines for the SM and other vehicles, and Maserati incorporated Citroën's technology, particularly in hydraulics. Engineer Giulio Alfieri was key to many of the ambitious designs of this period.

The first new arrival was the 1969 Indy—a Vignale-bodied four-seater GT with a traditional V8 drivetrain, 1,100 units of the Indy were made.

In 1971, the Bora was the company's first series production mid-engine model, an idea agreed with administrator Guy Malleret shortly after the 1968 takeover. The Bora ended Maserati's reputation for producing fast but technologically out of date cars, being the first Maserati with four wheel independent suspension. In contrast, competitor Lamborghini had used independent suspension in 1964.

In 1972, the Bora was transformed to the Merak, now employing a Tipo 114 SM-derived V6 enlarged to 3.0-litres.

Citroën never developed a 4-door version of the SM – instead Maserati developed the Quattroporte II, which shared most of its mechanical parts with the SM, including the mid-engine, front-wheel-drive layout, and six headlight arrangement.

To power this large car, Alfieri developed a V8 engine from the SM's V6 on the behest of Factory Manager Guy Malleret. Citroën's and Maserati's financial difficulties hampered the type homologation process; the development costs for the stillborn saloon further aggravated Maserati's situation. Only a dozen Quattroporte IIs were ever produced, all with the V6.

The replacement for the successful Ghibli was the Bertone-designed Khamsin, a front-engine grand tourer introduced in 1972 and produced until 1974; it combined the traditional Maserati V8 GT layout with modern independent suspension, unibody construction, and refined Citroën technologies such as DIRAVI power steering.

Crisis years

Meanwhile, the 1973 oil crisis put the brakes on the ambitious expansion of Maserati; demand for fuel-hungry sports cars and grand tourers shrank drastically. Austerity measures in Italy meant that the domestic market contracted by 60–70%. All of the main Italian GT car manufacturers were heavily affected, having to lay off workers in order to empty lots of unsold cars. Maserati received the hardest blow, as its home market sales accounted for over half of the total—in contrast with Ferrari's 20%. In this situation, the only Maserati automobile that continued to sell in appreciable numbers was the small-displacement Merak.

In 1974, with the 1973–75 recession at its climax, things took a turn for the worse. Citroën went bankrupt and its incorporation into PSA Peugeot Citroën begun. The year closed with domestic sales tumbling from 1973's 360 to 150 units, and losses exceeding the share capital.

On 22 May 1975, a press release from Citroën management abruptly announced Maserati had been put into liquidation. The workforce immediately picketed the factory, but production was not halted. Trade unions, the mayor of Modena, and local politicians mobilised to save the 800 jobs; industry minister Carlo Donat-Cattin even flew to Paris to meet Citroën chairman Francois Rollier. An agreement was reached in June, after several meetings and assemblies. During one of these meetings, Citroën liquidators disclosed that a possible Italian buyer had showed up, and the name of Alejandro de Tomaso was put forth for the first time. Citroën accepted to suspend liquidation as requested by the Italian government, which on its part guaranteed six months of special redundancy fund to pay the salaries.

De Tomaso era
On 8 August 1975, an agreement was signed at the Ministry of Industry in Rome, and property of Maserati passed from Citroën to Italian state-owned holding company GEPI and Alejandro de Tomaso, an Argentinian industrialist and former racing driver, became president and CEO. As of December 1979, GEPI's quota amounted to 88.75% of Maserati, the remaining 11.25% stake was being controlled by de Tomaso through a holding company which grouped his automotive interests in Maserati and Innocenti.

After de Tomaso bought Maserati in August 1975, he dismissed long time Chief Engineer Alfieri on the day of taking over the business.

Beginning in 1976, new models were introduced, sharing their underpinnings—but not their engines—with De Tomaso cars; first came the Kyalami grand tourer, derived from the De Tomaso Longchamp, restyled by Frua and powered by Maserati's own V8. Following the Kyalami was the Giugiaro-designed Quattroporte III based on the De Tomaso Deauville, which was introduced in 1976 and put on sale in 1979.

The Bora's sales dwindled down; the Khamsin was discontinued between 1982 and 1983. Progressively stripped of its Citroën-derived parts, the Merak continued to sell over one hundred units a year, until 1982.

The Biturbo

The 1980s saw the company largely abandoning the mid-engine sports car in favour of a compact front-engine, rear-drive coupé, the Biturbo.
Of fairly conventional construction, the Biturbo's highlight was its twin-turbocharged V6 engine, the first for a production car. This engine, descending from the 90° V6 engineered by Giulio Alfieri, was fitted in a large number of models, all sharing key components; every new Maserati launched up to the 1990s would be based on the Biturbo's platform.
The Biturbo family was extremely successful at exploiting the aspirational image of the Maserati name—selling 40,000 units.

In 1983 and 1984, the range was extended to include saloons (the 425 and 420) and a cabriolet (the Zagato-bodied Spyder), respectively on a long and short wheelbase of the Biturbo platform.

During 1984, Chrysler bought a 5% share in Maserati. Following an agreement between De Tomaso's friend and Chrysler head Lee Iacocca, a joint venture was signed. Maserati would go on to produce a car for export to the American market, the Chrysler TC by Maserati, with Chrysler-sourced engines. In July of that same year, a merger between Maserati and Nuova Innocenti was decided; it was carried out in 1985. Chrysler upped its stake to 15.6% by underwriting three quarters of a 75 billion Lire capital raise in 1986.

New Biturbo-based cars and model evolutions were launched year after year. In 1984, it was the 228, a large coupé built on the long wheelbase saloon chassis, with a new 2.8-litre version of the twin-turbocharged V6. Weber Fuel injection was phased in starting in 1986, bringing improved reliability and a host of new model variants. The same year, the ageing Quattroporte III was updated and marketed as the luxurious Royale, built to order in an handful of examples a year; its discontinuation in 1990 marked the disappearance of Maserati's four-cam V8 engine, a design that could trace its roots back to the 450S racer and the legendary 5000 GT. In 1987, the 2.8-litre 430 topped the saloon range. 1988 brought the Karif, a two-seater, based on the short wheelbase Spyder chassis. Meanwhile, the Biturbo name was dropped altogether, as updated coupés and saloons were updated and became the 222 and 422. 1989 marked the reintroduction of an eight-cylinder grand tourer: the Shamal, built on a modified short wheelbase Biturbo chassis, clad in new muscular bodywork styled by Marcello Gandini. It was powered by an all-new twin-turbocharged 32-valve V8 engine paired to a 6-speed gearbox. 2.0-litre, 24-valve V6 engines were also added to the Shamal range.

De Tomaso-FIAT years

In October 1989, De Tomaso bought the remaining GEPI quota. In December, FIAT entered in Maserati's history. Maserati and Innocenti were separated; Innocenti Milano S.p.A., the company that sold Innocenti cars, continued its business under a 51% FIAT Auto ownership. All of the Modena and Lambrate plants went to a newly created company, the still existent Maserati S.p.A.; 49% of it was owned by FIAT Auto and 51% was controlled by De Tomaso through the old company, Officine Alfieri Maserati.

In the early '90s, a mid-engine sports car was developed, the Chubasco—which was to début in 1992. It featured Gandini-designed body, a V8 powertrain, and a backbone chassis. The project was cancelled, as it proved too expensive.
Starting in 1990, the entire range of the Biturbo received a facelift designed by Marcello Gandini, on the lines of the Shamal's styling. The last version of the Biturbo coupé was called Racing. It was a transitional model in which several features to be found on the upcoming Ghibli were tested.

The Ghibli II was introduced in 1992. It was a six-cylinder coupé, with modified Biturbo underpinnings dressed by new Gandini bodywork (toned down from the Shamal) and the latest evolution of the 24-valve twin-turbocharged V6 with record breaking specific output.
The underpinnings of the stillborn Chubasco gave birth to the Maserati Barchetta, a small open top mid-engine sports car styled by Synthesis Design's Carlo Gaino. A one-make racing series was held in 1992 and 1993, using the Barchetta Corsa racing version; the road-going Barchetta Stradale was never put into production. Just 17 units of the Barchetta were produced.

Between 1992 and 1994, all models save for the Ghibli and Shamal were progressively discontinued.

FIAT ownership

On 19 May 1993, 17 years after having rescued it from liquidation, Alejandro De Tomaso sold his 51% stake in Maserati to FIAT, which became the sole owner.

In 1994, the aging Quattroporte III/Royale was replaced by the Quattroporte IV which was ultimately based on Biturbo underpinnings. Styled by Marcello Gandini, it was initially available with a V6 engine shared with the Ghibli II. A more powerful V8 variant was made available in 1996 and "Seicilindri" and "Ottocilindri" (six and eight cylindres in Italian) badging was introduced to distinguish between the two models. The engine of the V8 model was a development of the Shamal's V8.

Over two decades after the ill-fated Chrysler TC by Maserati during Chrysler's brief ownership stake in Maserati, the two companies became interconnected again when FIAT purchased majority control of Chrysler in 2011 as a result of Chrysler's bankruptcy. Maserati and Citroen also later interconnected for the first time since 1975, following the Stellantis merger in 2021.

Ferrari
In July 1997, FIAT sold a 50% share in the company to Maserati's long-time arch-rival Ferrari (Ferrari itself being owned by FIAT). In 1999, Ferrari took full control, making Maserati its luxury division. A new factory was built, replacing the existing 1940s-era facility.

The steps taken by the new parent company resulted in the improved Quattroporte Evoluzione which was introduced at the March 1998 Geneva Motor Show.

In 1998, a new chapter began in Maserati's history when the company launched the 3200 GT.

The last links to the de Tomaso era were cut in 2002, when the 3200 GT was replaced by the Maserati Coupé and Spyder; evolved from the 3200, these cars used an all-new, naturally aspirated, dry sump 4.2-litre V8 with a transaxle gearbox. In turn Coupé and Spyder were replaced by the GranTurismo and GranCabrio.

Meanwhile, two new models have been shown to the public: the MC12 road supersports and successful GT racer with a Ferrari Enzo–derived chassis and engine and the new Quattroporte, a luxury saloon with the 4.2-litre V8 engine of the Gran Turismo. Nowadays, Maserati is back in business and successfully selling automobiles on a global basis.
In 2001, Ferrari decided to change all of the old tooling and installed high-tech devices in the Modena factory.

Since early 2002, Maserati once again entered the United States market, which has quickly become its largest market worldwide. The company has also re-entered the racing arena with their Trofeo and, in December 2003, the MC12 (formerly known as the MCC), which was developed according to FIA GT regulations and has since competed with great success in the world FIA GT championship, winning the teams championship three consecutive times from 2005 to 2007. The MC12 has also been raced in various national GT championship as well as in the American Le Mans series. The MC12 is based on the Enzo Ferrari sports car; 50 street-legal homologation models (roadsters and coupés) have been sold.

The Maserati and Alfa Romeo Group under FIAT Group

The Maserati and Alfa Romeo group, under FIAT Group, started in 2005, when Maserati was split off from Ferrari and partnered with Alfa Romeo. On 9 June 2005, the 20,000th Maserati, a Quattroporte V, left the factory. In the second quarter of 2007, Maserati made profit for the first time in 17 years under FIAT ownership.

On January 22, 2010, FIAT announced that it had created a new partnership/brand group for Alfa Romeo, Maserati, and Abarth. The group was led by Harald J. Wester, the current CEO of Maserati. Sergio Marchionne stated that "[the] purpose of bringing the Alfa Romeo, Maserati and Abarth brands under the same leadership is to emphasize and leverage the value of the shared qualities of the three brands in terms of their sporting characteristics and performance." Abarth stayed under Wester's leadership until 2013, leaving Maserati and Alfa Romeo in the brand group, led by Wester. Although Maserati and Alfa Romeo are in a brand group, Alfa Romeo is structured under FCA Italy S.p.A., which itself is structured under FCA, whereas Maserati is structured solely under FCA. In addition, in an interview with Wester in 2015, he clarified that his "role at Maserati is different from that in the Alfa Romeo as the latter is better integrated into the FIAT Group" and that "the new Alfa car won't share any parts with the current Maserati model. I'm not planning any technical merging of these two makes."

In 2013, Maserati started its expansion with the Quattroporte VI, which was designed to better compete with the Mercedes-Benz S-Class. This was followed by the introduction of the Ghibli, which was slated to compete against the Mercedes-Benz E-Class and the BMW 5 Series. On May 6, 2014, Maserati confirmed production of the Levante SUV and the Alfieri (previously a 2+2 concept sports car that was named after Alfieri Maserati). The Alfieri has not started production as yet. At this event, it was revealed that 2014 will be the last year of production for the GranTurismo and GranCabrio (GranTurismo Convertible in the US), although production of the GranTurismo was extended, with a facelifted GranTurismo being unveiled in 2018. The model was finally phased out in November 2019.

Along with their expansion, Maserati started their re-entrance into the high-performance car field, in order to compete with brands such as Mercedes-AMG, BMW M, Porsche, Jaguar, and in certain cases, Ferrari. This was done by introducing Maserati models that have high power output engines, higher performance components, and better handling. The top-of-the-line variants of the Quattroporte VI, Ghibli, and Levante have  V8 engines with all-wheel drive, in order to better compete with their rival offerings.

Maserati sales in 2013 was 15,400 units, which is up from just over 6,000 units worldwide in 2012 (2013 included the release of the new Quattroporte and Ghibli towards the end of the year, and thus the first year to fully represent the sales inclusive of these models is 2014). In May, 2014, Maserati sold a company record of over 3,000 cars worldwide, causing them to increase production of the Ghibli and Quattroporte. For that same month in the United States, Maserati sold 1,114 vehicles, which is up 406.19% over the same month in the previous year in the United States. Maserati's best month of sales in the United States was September 2014, with 1,318 units sold. The month in 2014 where the increase on sales for the same month of the previous year was the highest was May, with a volume increase of 406.19%. The sales target for 2018 was 75,000 units worldwide.

2014 marked a historic record of 13,411 total units sold in North America for the year, a 169% increase versus 2013, boasting the highest-ever overall sales year for Maserati North America, Inc. Worldwide, in 2014 Maserati sold about 36,500 cars, a 136% increase over 2013. Harald J. Wester stated that Maserati would not surpass the 70,000 sales per year mark, and that Maserati would maintain its current position in the higher end of the luxury sports car market, rather than expanding downmarket and making vehicles smaller and less expensive than the Ghibli and Levante (such as those similar to the Audi Q5 and Mercedes-Benz C-Class), as other FCA brands, specifically Alfa Romeo, are in those market spaces.

Since 2009, Marco Tencone was the head designer of Maserati cars, although, in late 2015, he was announced as remaining in executive positions at Lancia and FIAT only.<ref>Luca Ciferri,  FCA design gets more international as non-Italians take key jobs from Automotive News Europe on October 15, 2015.</ref>

In 2014, Fiat S.p.A. merged with American automaker Chrysler to form Fiat Chrysler Automobiles. Subsequently, in 2021, FCA merged with the French PSA Group to form Stellantis, reuniting Maserati with Citroën.

 Electrification 
On 17 March 2022, chief executive officer Davide Grasso announced that Maserati will produce an electric version of all of its models by 2025. CEO also announced the plans to phase out all of its internal combustion engine vehicles by 2030. All Maserati EVs will wear the Folgore name (that means "lightning" in Italian).

AutomobilesSee List of Maserati vehicles for a complete historical listCurrent and upcoming models

Maserati Quattroporte

Italian for "four-door," the Maserati Quattroporte is a sports luxury saloon. The sixth generation of the Quattroporte was introduced in 2013. The Quattroporte is currently available in S Q4, GTS and Diesel trim. The S Q4 has an advanced four wheel drive system, and a 404-horsepower twin-turbochrged V6 engine. The GTS is rear wheel drive, and has a 523-horsepower V8. The sixth-generation of the Quattroporte has grown in size in order to better compete with the roomier luxury saloons like the Mercedes-Benz S-Class.

Maserati Ghibli

The first presentation of the Ghibli was on 20 April 2013 in Shanghai. It is a sports executive saloon that competes against the BMW 5 Series, Mercedes E-Class and Audi A6. The car, along with the new Quattroporte, is built in the Italian factory of Grugliasco, Turin (former Bertone). The base Ghibli is rated at 330 horsepower, the Ghibli Diesel at 275 horsepower (also 250 in Italy only), and the Ghibli S Q4 at 410 horsepower. Since 2018, the base Ghibli is rated at 350 horsepower and the S Q4 at 450 horsepower.

An upgraded Ghibli will be Maserati's first electrified model and is expected to be presented in Beijing at Auto China 2020.

Maserati Levante

The Maserati Levante is a crossover SUV introduced in 2014. It has been anticipated with the Maserati Kubang concept SUV in September 2003 at the Frankfurt Motor Show and again in 2011. It was announced, at the Paris Motor Show held in Paris in September 2012. The Levante is assembled in Mirafiori Plant, in Turin. Production was confirmed on May 6, 2014. The Levante is offered with a 3.0-litre V6 rated at either 350 or 425 horsepower states of tune. All models have all-wheel drive.

Maserati MC20

The Maserati MC20 is a 2-door, mid-engined sports car that debuted in September 2020. The car features a carbon fibre monocoque and a 3-litre V6 engine producing 630 horsepower.

Maserati Grecale

The Maserati Grecale is a front-engine, five-door, five passenger compact luxury crossover SUV. Grecale shares the company's Giorgio platform with the Alfa Romeo Stelvio and the fifth generation Jeep Grand Cherokee. Available engines include 300 or 330 hp mild hybrid inline-four and a 530 hp V6 Nettuno'' engine for the Trofeo specification.

Maserati GranTurismo

The Maserati GranTurismo is a grand tourer introduced in 2007. A convertible (GranCabrio) version is also available in standard, Sport, and MC models. The final production year for the Maserati GranTurismo was scheduled to be 2014, and its position would be succeeded by Maserati Alfieri. Production continued until 2019, with final example called Zéda rolled off the line. The next GranTurismo is scheduled to be released at 2024.

Sales history
Annual Maserati shipments to sales network (number of type-approved vehicles)

Motorsport

Throughout its history, Maserati has participated in various forms of motorsports including Formula One, sportscar racing and touring car racing, both as a works team and through private entrants. Notable drivers include Juan Manuel Fangio and Prince Bira of Siam.

Maserati developed fifteen GranTurismo MC racecars, homologated for the European Cup and National Endurance Series, one of which was raced by GT motorsport organization Cool Victory in Dubai in January, 2010.

On 10 January 2022, Maserati announced they would be joining Formula E in the 2022–23 season. They will become the first Italian Manufacturer in the series once they start competing.

See also

 Maserati (motorcycle)
 CMD – Costruzioni Motori Diesel S.p.A.

Notes

References

Additional sources

External links

 
 Official Maserati Racing website 
 Official Maserati Awards website
 Autoexpress.cz: Andrea Piccini on the Maserati GranTurismo MC Stradale

 
Italian companies established in 1914
Manufacturing companies based in Bologna
Stellantis
Italian brands
Luxury motor vehicle manufacturers
Sports car manufacturers
Vehicle manufacturing companies established in 1914
Car brands